Little Andaman Island (Onge: Gaubolambe) is the fourth largest of the Andaman Islands of India with an area of 707 km2, lying at the southern end of the archipelago. It belongs to the South Andaman administrative district, part of the Indian union territory of Andaman and Nicobar Islands.

Geography
The island is in the Bay of Bengal and belongs to the Little Andaman Group, and is separated from Rutland Island in Great Andaman by the Duncan Passage. The Little Andaman Group is the counterpart of the Great Andaman island group.

The low-lying island has widespread rainforest and several rare species of marine turtle.
Little Andaman Island has white sandy beaches and bewitching waterfalls.
The Little Andaman Lighthouse (a.k.a. Richardson's Lighthouse) is located 14 km south by road from Hut Bay port and is situated on the Southern tip of Little Andaman Island.

Climate

Administration
Administratively, Little Andaman Island is part of Little Andaman Tehsil.

Demographics 
The island is home to the indigenous Onge tribe, who call the island Egu Belong, and has been a tribal reserve since 1957. Settlers from Bengal and other places also live here. As per the census of 2011, the population was 18,823 in 4,093 households, spread among 18 villages.
The main village of Kwate-tu-Kwage is located on Hut Bay.

Transportation
Hut Bay wharf, a deep water wharf that can be approached through a gap in the coral reef, on the east coast of the island is the entry point of Little Andaman Island. Daily boat services connect Hut Bay wharf with Port Blair in seven hours voyage. 
Additionally, there are a helicopter services by Pavan Hans Ltd. and a sea plane connection available between Port Blair and Hut Bay. The flight time by helicopter or sea plane is approximately 40 minutes.

There is a road alongside the east coastal line.

Tourism
Little Andaman offers surfing, boating through the creeks, and visits to an elephant logging  plantation. 
Butler Bay, 14 km from the Hut Bay Jetty, is a beach popular among tourists due to coral viewing, surfing and other marine activities. Tourist huts are available on the seashore itself flanked by the coconut plantation. Netaji Nagar Beach is 11 km from the Hut Bay jetty.

Image gallery

References 

Cities and towns in South Andaman district
Islands of the Andaman and Nicobar Islands